Tarski's undefinability theorem, stated and proved by Alfred Tarski in 1933, is an important limitative result in mathematical logic, the foundations of mathematics, and in formal semantics. Informally, the theorem states that arithmetical truth cannot be defined in arithmetic.

The theorem applies more generally to any sufficiently strong formal system, showing that truth in the standard model of the system cannot be defined within the system.

History
In 1931, Kurt Gödel published the incompleteness theorems, which he proved in part by showing how to represent the syntax of formal logic within first-order arithmetic. Each expression of the formal language of arithmetic is assigned a distinct number. This procedure is known variously as Gödel numbering, coding and, more generally, as arithmetization. In particular, various sets of expressions are coded as sets of numbers. For various syntactic properties (such as being a formula, being a sentence, etc.), these sets are computable. Moreover, any computable set of numbers can be defined by some arithmetical formula. For example, there are formulas in the language of arithmetic defining the set of codes for arithmetic sentences, and for provable arithmetic sentences.

The undefinability theorem shows that this encoding cannot be done for semantic concepts such as truth. It shows that no sufficiently rich interpreted language can represent its own semantics. A corollary is that any metalanguage capable of expressing the semantics of some object language must have expressive power exceeding that of the object language. The metalanguage includes primitive notions, axioms, and rules absent from the object language, so that there are theorems provable in the metalanguage not provable in the object language.

The undefinability theorem is conventionally attributed to Alfred Tarski. Gödel also discovered the undefinability theorem in 1930, while proving his incompleteness theorems published in 1931, and well before the 1933 publication of Tarski's work (Murawski 1998). While Gödel never published anything bearing on his independent discovery of undefinability, he did describe it in a 1931 letter to John von Neumann. Tarski had obtained almost all results of his 1933 monograph "The Concept of Truth in the Languages of the Deductive Sciences" between 1929 and 1931, and spoke about them to Polish audiences.  However, as he emphasized in the paper, the undefinability theorem was the only result he did not obtain earlier. According to the footnote to the undefinability theorem (Twierdzenie I) of the 1933 monograph, the theorem and the sketch of the proof were added to the monograph only after the manuscript had been sent to the printer in 1931. Tarski reports there that, when he presented the content of his monograph to the Warsaw Academy of Science on March 21, 1931, he expressed at this place only some conjectures, based partly on his own investigations and partly on Gödel's short report on the incompleteness theorems "" [Some metamathematical results on the definiteness of decision and consistency], Austrian Academy of Sciences, Vienna, 1930.

Statement
We will first state a simplified version of Tarski's theorem, then state and prove in the next section the theorem Tarski proved in 1933.

Let  be the language of first-order arithmetic. This is the theory of the natural numbers, including their addition and multiplication, axiomatized by the first-order Peano axioms. This is a "first-order" theory: the quantifiers extend over natural numbers, but not over sets or functions of natural numbers. The theory is strong enough to describe recursively defined integer functions such as exponentiation, factorials or the Fibonacci sequence.

Let  be the standard structure for  i.e.  consists of the ordinary set of natural numbers and their addition and multiplication. Thus  is the "interpreted first-order language of arithmetic".

Each formula  in  has a Gödel number  This is a natural number that "encodes"  In that way, the language  can talk about formulas in  not just about numbers.

Tarski's undefinability theorem:  There is no -formula  that defines 
That is, there is no -formula  such that for every -sentence   holds in 

Informally, the theorem says that the concept of truth of first-order arithmetic statements cannot be defined by a formula in first-order arithmetic. This implies a major limitation on the scope of "self-representation". It is possible to define a formula  whose extension is  but only by drawing on a metalanguage whose expressive power goes beyond that of  For example, a truth predicate for first-order arithmetic can be defined in second-order arithmetic. However, this formula would only be able to define a truth predicate for formulas in the original language  To define a truth predicate for the metalanguage would require a still higher metametalanguage, and so on.

If we now consider the Gödel number  of the formula  and ask whether the sentence  is true in  we obtain a contradiction. (This is known as a diagonal argument.)

The theorem is a corollary of Post's theorem about the arithmetical hierarchy, proved some years after Tarski (1933). A semantic proof of Tarski's theorem from Post's theorem is obtained by reductio ad absurdum as follows. Assuming   is arithmetically definable, there is a natural number  such that  is definable by a formula at level  of the arithmetical hierarchy. However,  is -hard for all  Thus the arithmetical hierarchy collapses at level  contradicting Post's theorem.

General form
Tarski proved a stronger theorem than the one stated above, using an entirely syntactical method. The resulting theorem applies to any formal language with negation, and with sufficient capability for self-reference that the diagonal lemma holds. First-order arithmetic satisfies these preconditions, but the theorem applies to much more general formal systems, such as ZFC.

Tarski's undefinability theorem (general form): Let  be any interpreted formal language which includes negation and has a Gödel numbering  satisfying the diagonal lemma, i.e. for every -formula  (with one free variable ) there is a sentence  such that  holds in  Then there is no -formula  with the following property: for every -sentence   is true in 

The proof of Tarski's undefinability theorem in this form is again by reductio ad absurdum. Suppose that an -formula  as above existed, i.e., if  is a sentence of arithmetic, then  holds in  if and only if  holds in  Hence for all  the formula  holds in  But the diagonal lemma yields a counterexample to this equivalence, by giving a "liar" formula  such that  holds in  This is a contradiction. QED.

Discussion
The formal machinery of the proof given above is wholly elementary except for the diagonalization which the diagonal lemma requires. The proof of the diagonal lemma is likewise surprisingly simple; for example, it does not invoke recursive functions in any way. The proof does assume that every -formula has a Gödel number, but the specifics of a coding method are not required. Hence Tarski's theorem is much easier to motivate and prove than the more celebrated theorems of Gödel about the metamathematical properties of first-order arithmetic.

Smullyan (1991, 2001) has argued forcefully that Tarski's undefinability theorem deserves much of the attention garnered by Gödel's incompleteness theorems. That the latter theorems have much to say about all of mathematics and more controversially, about a range of philosophical issues (e.g., Lucas 1961) is less than evident. Tarski's theorem, on the other hand, is not directly about mathematics but about the inherent limitations of any formal language sufficiently expressive to be of real interest. Such languages are necessarily capable of enough self-reference for the diagonal lemma to apply to them. The broader philosophical import of Tarski's theorem is more strikingly evident.

An interpreted language is strongly-semantically-self-representational exactly when the language contains predicates and function symbols defining all the semantic concepts specific to the language. Hence the required functions include the "semantic valuation function" mapping a formula  to its truth value  and the "semantic denotation function" mapping a term  to the object it denotes. Tarski's theorem then generalizes as follows: No sufficiently powerful language is strongly-semantically-self-representational.

The undefinability theorem does not prevent truth in one theory from being defined in a stronger theory. Similarly, the set of true formulas of the standard model of second order arithmetic (or -th order arithmetic for any ) can be defined by a formula in first-order ZFC.

See also

References

 J. L. Bell, and M. Machover, 1977. A Course in Mathematical Logic. North-Holland.
 G. Boolos, J. Burgess, and R. Jeffrey, 2002. Computability and Logic, 4th ed. Cambridge University Press.
 J. R. Lucas, 1961. "Mind, Machines, and Gödel ". Philosophy 36: 112–27. 
 R. Murawski, 1998. Undefinability of truth. The problem of the priority: Tarski vs. Gödel. History and Philosophy of Logic 19, 153–160
 R. Smullyan, 1991. Godel's Incompleteness Theorems. Oxford Univ. Press.
 R. Smullyan, 2001. "Gödel’s Incompleteness Theorems". In L. Goble, ed., The Blackwell Guide to Philosophical Logic, Blackwell, 72–89.
 A. Tarski, 1933. Pojęcie Prawdy w Językach Nauk Dedukcyjnych. Nakładem Towarzystwa Naukowego Warszawskiego.
 
 A. Tarski, tr. J. H. Woodger, 1983. "The Concept of Truth in Formalized Languages". English translation of Tarski's 1936 article. In A. Tarski, ed. J. Corcoran, 1983, Logic, Semantics, Metamathematics, Hackett.

Mathematical logic
Metatheorems
Philosophy of logic
Theorems in the foundations of mathematics
Theories of truth